Shaikh, also rendered as Sheikh, Sheik, Shaik, Shaykh, Shaikh, Shekh, Cheikh, Šeih, Šejh, Şeyh and other variants (Arabic: , shaykh; pl.  shuyūkh), is a title given to many South Asian Muslim castes. It originally was a word or honorific term in the Arabic language that commonly designated a chief of a tribe, royal family member, Muslim religious scholar, or "Elder". However in South Asia it was used as a title by castes that rarely had any Arab descent.

Origin
In South Asia it is not an ethnic title but an occupational title generally attributed to Muslim trading families. The Shaikhs claimed to be descendants of Arabs, however almost all Shaikhs did not actually descend from Arabs. Hindus who converted to Islam and took the title shaikh tended to be of the Kshatriya varna, although use of the title was flexible. In the former Frontier Regions and Punjab of Pakistan, the title shaikh was given to recent converts and not those of Arab descent. The Julaha weaver caste became Ansaris, who claimed to descend from Abu Ayub Al-Ansari. The butcher castes claimed to descend from the Quraysh tribe. The Kayastha record keeper caste became Siddiques, who claimed to descend from Abu Bakr Al-Siddiq. 

A famous saying which attests to the flexibility of the title of shaikh stated: "Last year I was a Julaha (weaver); this year I am a sheikh; next year, if the crops are good, I shall be a Syed."

Sub-divisions

The subdivisions of the Shaikh include:
 Shaikh Qidwai, who claim to be descendants of the Qazi Qidwa, a son of the Sultans of Rum
 Shaikh Hashmi, who claim to be descendants of the Banu Hashim clan of the Banu Quraish tribe. The Islamic prophet, Muhammad belonged to this clan. Usually carry the title Sayyid or Sharif
 Shaikh Siddiqui, who claim to be descendants of Abu Bakar, the first Khalifa of Islam. Actually are descendants of the Hindu Kayastha caste.
 Shaikh Usmani (Osmani), who claim to be descendants of Uthman Ibn Affan the third Khalifa of Islam
 Shaikh Farooqi, Honorific reverence to Umar Farooq Bin Al-Khattab
 Shaikh Narowali

See also 
 Sheikh
 Shaikhzada
 Sindhi Shaikh
 Punjabi Shaikh
 Muslim Kayasths
 Kashmiri Shaikhs
 Gujarati Shaikh
 Rajasthani Shaikh
 Shaikh of Bihar
 Shaikh of Uttar Pradesh

References

Titles
Islamic culture
Social groups of Pakistan
Social groups of India
Muslim communities of India
Shaikh clans
Muhajir communities
Titles in Bangladesh